Zé Carlos is a nickname for people with the given name José Carlos; it can refer to:

Zé Carlos (footballer, born 1943), full name José Carlos Gaspar Ferreira, Brazilian football defender
Zé Carlos (footballer, 1945–2018), full name José Carlos Bernardo, Brazilian football centre-back
Zé Carlos (poet) (1949-1977), full name José Carlos Schwarz, Bissau-Guinean people poet and musician
Zé Carlos (footballer, born 1954), full name José Carlos dos Santos, Brazilian football forward
Zé Carlos (footballer, born 1955), full name José Carlos Pessanha, Brazilian football goalkeeper
Zé Carlos (footballer, born 1962), full name José Carlos da Costa Araújo, Brazilian football goalkeeper
Zé Carlos (footballer, born 1965), full name José Carlos Pereira do Nascimento, Brazilian football defender
Zé Carlos (footballer, born 1968), full name José Carlos de Almeida, Brazilian football defender
Zé Carlos (footballer, born 1975), full name José Carlos Santos Silva, Brazilian football forward
Zé Carlos (footballer, born 1979), full name José Carlos Gomes Filho, Brazilian football midfielder
Zé Carlos (footballer, born 1983), full name José Carlos Ferreira Filho, Brazilian football striker
Zé Carlos (footballer, born 1985), full name José Carlos dos Anjos Sávio, Brazilian football goalkeeper
Zé Carlos Semedo (born 1992), Santomean football forward
Zé Carlos (footballer, born 1998), full name José Carlos Teixeira Lopes Reis Gonçalves, Portuguese football right-back
Zé Carlos (footballer, born 2001), full name José Carlos Natário Ferreira, Portuguese football right-back
Zé Carlos, the 8th series of Gato Fedorento, a Portuguese comedy show

See also
José Carlos (disambiguation)

Portuguese masculine given names
Brazilian given names